Schubert is a German surname.

Geographical distribution
As of 2014, 74.2% of all known bearers of the surname Schubert were residents of Germany, 13.2% of the United States, 2.5% of Australia, 2.4% of Austria and 1.9% of Brazil.

In Germany, the frequency of the surname was higher than national average (1:804) in the following states:
 1. Saxony (1:188)
 2. Brandenburg (1:415)
 3. Thuringia (1:464)
 4. Saxony-Anhalt (1:484)
 5. Mecklenburg-Vorpommern (1:667)

People
Adam Schubert (born 1985), Australian professional rugby league footballer
Albrecht Schubert (1886–1966), German general 
Alexander Schubert (born 1979), German composer
André Schubert (born 1971), German football player and coach
Bernard Schubert (1895–1988), American screenwriter and television producer
Christoph Schubert (born 1982), German professional ice hockey player
Cordula Schubert (born 1959), German politician
David Schubert (1913–1946), American poet
Ernő Schubert (1881–1931), Hungarian track and field athlete
Éva Schubert (1931–2017), Hungarian actress
Ferdinand Schubert (1794–1859), Austrian composer, brother of Franz Schubert
François Schubert (1808–1878), German composer
František Schubert (1894–1942), Czech chess master
Franz Schubert (1797–1828), Austrian composer
Friedrich von Schubert (1789–1865), Russian explorer and cartographer
Friedrich Schubert, (1897–1947), German World War II war criminal
Gotthilf Heinrich von Schubert (1780–1860), German physician and naturalist
Grant Schubert (born 1980), Australian field hockey player
Günter Schubert (1938–2008), German actor
Heinz Schubert (composer) (1908–1945), German composer and conductor
Heinz Schubert (SS officer) (1914–1987), German SS officer
Heinz Schubert (actor) (1925–1999), German actor
Hermann Schubert (1848–1911), German mathematician, founder of the Schubert calculus
Horst Schubert (1919–2001), German mathematician
Ian Schubert (born 1956), Australian rugby league footballer
Jiří Schubert (born 1988), Czech professional football player
Johann Andreas Schubert (1808–1870), German engineer and academic
Joseph Schubert (disambiguation), several people
Július Schubert (1922–1949), Slovak-Hungarian footballer
Karin Schubert (born 1944), German actress
Karsten Schubert (1961–2019), German art dealer and publisher
Katharina Schubert (born 1963), German actress
Kevin Schubert (1927–2007), Australian rugby league footballer
Kort Schubert (born 1979), American rugby union footballer
Mark Schubert, American swimming coach
Max Schubert (1915–1994), Australian winemaker
Michael Schubert (born 1967), East German weightlifter
Misha Schubert (born 1973), Australian newspaper journalist
Olaf Schubert, stage name of Michael Haubold (born 1967), German comedian and musician
Pit Schubert (born 1935), German author, climber and mountaineer
Richard von Schubert (1850–1933), German army commander
Samantha Schubert (1969–2016), Malaysian actress and model
Steve Schubert (born 1951), American football player
Sir Sydney Schubert (1928–2015), Australian public servant
Theodor von Schubert (1758–1825), German astronomer
Wilhelm Schubert van Ehrenberg (1630/1637–c.1676), Flemish painter

See also
Martina Navratilova (born 1956), Czech-American tennis player, born Šubertová (the Czech feminine version of Schubert)

References

German-language surnames
Jewish surnames
Occupational surnames